97 Bowery is a five-story loft building on the Bowery between Hester and Grand Streets in the Lower East Side and Chinatown neighborhoods of Manhattan, New York City.  

The building was designed by Peter L.P. Tostevin in the Italianate style, and was built in 1869 for John P. Jube & Co., which occupied it until 1935.  The building has a cast-iron facade from the J. B. & W. W. Cornell Iron Works, the details of which were most likely chosen from a catalog. As such, it is typical of cast-iron construction in the 1850s and 1860s.  At the time it was built, the Bowery was the primary commercial street of the Lower East Side.  Today, the building is a rare cast-iron survivor in the area, as well as a reminder of the importance of the Bowery as a commercial center after the Civil War.

97 Bowery was designated a New York City Landmark by the New York City Landmark Preservation Commission on September 14, 2010.

See also 
 List of New York City Designated Landmarks in Manhattan below 14th Street

References 

Bowery
Cast-iron architecture in New York City
Chinatown, Manhattan
Commercial buildings completed in 1869
Lower East Side
New York City Designated Landmarks in Manhattan